Antonio Álvarez Méndez, better known as Antonio Álvarez Solís  (Madrid, July 18, 1929 - March 30, 2020), was a Spanish journalist.

Biography
He started working for the newspaper La Vanguardia where he became editor aged 27. Later he was founding director of magazine Interviú and was one of the founders of the satirical magazine Por Favor in 1974. He was a collaborator of several televisions and radio stations at national and regional level. In his last years he collaborated with the Gara and Deia newspapers.

He died on March 30, 2020.

Work
Qué es el búnker. Barcelona: La Gaya Ciencia, 1976. .
Divorcio, recta final. Barcelona: Ediciones Actuales, 1977. .
El año que va a pasar. Bitácora, 1990. .
Verte desnuda. Madrid: Temas de Hoy, 1992. . 
Jóvenes de corazón: la utilidad de la vejez. Barcelona: Martínez Roca, 2000. .
Cartas a Euskadi: dos años en el micrófono. Madrid: Foca, Ediciones y Distribuciones Generales, 2003. .
Horas sin tiempo. Bilbao: Euskal Irrati Telebista (EITB), 2007. .
Así veo Euskal Herria. Gara, 2009. .
Mujeres, ultramarinos y coloniales. Txalaparta, 2010. .
Crisis del periodismo: la información y la calle. Nafarroa: Erein, 2012. .
Él, historia de una amistad. Círculo Rojo, 2017. .

References

1929 births
2020 deaths
Spanish journalists